Gatum Gatum was an Australian Thoroughbred racehorse who won the 1963 Melbourne Cup.

Despite winning the 1961 SAJC South Australian Derby as a three-year-old and a second placing in the 1963 Caulfield Cup he carried just 7 st 12 lb (50 kg) to victory in the Cup.

His owner, Malcolm Reid had bred the 1945 Melbourne Cup winner Rainbird but had sold her as a filly to his brother Clifford.

References

Melbourne Cup winners
1958 racehorse births
Racehorses bred in Australia
Racehorses trained in Australia
Thoroughbred family 1-b